"Fotonovela" is a song by Spanish singer Ivan, released in 1984 as the first single from his fourth studio album, Baila (1985). The song was co-written by Luis Gómez Escolar and Pedro Vidal, and produced by Vidal. Upon its first release as a single in Spain in 1984, the song peaked at No. 14. The song reached the top 10 in France, Switzerland and West Germany, peaking at No. 3, No. 4 and No. 9, respectively. It also reached No. 28 in Belgium, No. 42 in Italy and No. 47 in the Netherlands.

Track listing 

 Spanish 7-inch single

A. "Fotonovela (Capítulo I)" – 4:32
B. "Cena fria" – 3:59

 Spanish 12-inch maxi single

A. "Fotonovela (Capítulo II)" – 6:08
B1. "Cena fria" – 3:59
B2. "Fotonovela (Instrumental)" – 4:32

Charts

Weekly charts

References 

1984 songs
1984 singles
CBS Records singles
Ivan (singer) songs